The Premier of Anguilla is the head of government in the British Overseas Territory of Anguilla. The Premier is appointed by the Governor of Anguilla on behalf of the monarch of the United Kingdom, currently King Charles III.

Up until 2019 the office was known as Chief Minister of Anguilla, but the Anguilla Constitution (Amendment) Order 2019, which took effect on 14 May 2019, renamed the position as Premier.

The current Premier is Ellis Webster.

List of chief ministers of Anguilla (1976–2019)

List of premiers of Anguilla (2019–present)

See also 
 List of current heads of government in the United Kingdom and dependencies
 List of leaders of dependent territories
 Elections in Anguilla
 Politics of Anguilla
 List of prime ministers of Saint Kitts and Nevis
 Prime Minister of the West Indies Federation (Historical)

References

 
Government of Anguilla
Premier